Derek Davies (birth unknown) is a former professional rugby league footballer who played in the 1960s. He played at club level for Hull F.C. (Heritage №).

References

External links
Search for "Davies" at rugbyleagueproject.org
(archived by web.archive.org) Stats → Past Players → D at hullfc.com (statistics for player surnames beginning with 'C' and 'D' swapped)
 (archived by web.archive.org) Statistics at hullfc.com
Search for "Derek Davies" at britishnewspaperarchive.co.uk
Search for "Derek Davis" at britishnewspaperarchive.co.uk

Year of birth unknown
Place of birth unknown
English rugby league players
Hull F.C. players